The  European Cybercrime Centre (EC3 or EC³) is the body of the Police Office (Europol) of the European Union (EU), headquartered in The Hague, that coordinates cross-border law enforcement activities against computer crime and acts as a centre of technical expertise on the matter.

History 
When officially launched on 11 January 2013, the European Cybercrime Centre was not expected to be fully operational until 2015.
It began with a staff of 30, with plans to expand to 40 by the end of 2013.
It began operations with a budget of about 3.6 million euros.

Organisational structure and key personnel 
The head of EC3 reports directly to the head of Europol.
The first person to head the department was the former head of Danish domestic intelligence, who left Europol in January 2015 to become Barclays' Chief Intelligence Security Officer.

Responsibilities and cooperation with other bodies 
EC3 was tasked with assisting member states in their efforts to dismantle and disrupt cybercrime networks and developing tools and providing training.

EC3 works with the European Union Intelligence and Situation Centre (INTCEN), the United Nations Office on Drugs and Crime (UNDCP), the World Customs Organization (WCO), the European Border and Coast Guard Agency (EBCG, also known as Frontex), and the European Anti-fraud Office (OLAF). 
Press releases in 2015 also revealed that EC3 works with American security services, such as the Federal Bureau of Investigation (FBI).

There is some overlap with the responsibilities of the European Union Agency for Network and Information Security  (ENISA).

At a press conference on 10 February 2014, asked about massive identity theft uncovered by the German Federal Office for Information Security,  the then head of the EC3, Troels Oerting, said that his unit was not responsible for combatting "politically motivated hacking and/or espionage against EU institutions".

Activities 
In February 2014, Troels Oerting reported successes that the unit had had in 2013. These included catching internet extortioners, with 13 arrests. They had also been involved in fighting malware attacks on banks using botnets and – in cooperation with Microsoft and experts from the German Federal Criminal Police Office – taking down the ZeroAccess botnet.
In 2014, details were revealed of Operation Onymous, which took down a number of Darknet sites, including Pandora , Cloud 9, Hydra, Blue Sky, Topix, Flugsvamp, Cannabis Road, Black Market and Silk Road 2.0.

In 2015, American media reported on a coordinated FBI operation with the assistance of EC3 to take down Dark0de, the largest English -language communication and trading platform for cybercriminals.

Participating states 
As well as the EU member states, there is cooperation with a number of other states, including Australia, Canada, North Macedonia, Norway, Switzerland, Monaco, Bosnia and Herzegovina, Colombia, Moldova, Russia, Turkey, the Republic of Serbia, Montenegro, Ukraine and the United States.

See also
European Network and Information Security Agency
National Cyber Security Centre (disambiguation)

References

External links
 

2013 establishments in the Netherlands
Computer security organizations
European Union agencies' subsidiary organisations
Europol
Government agencies established in 2013
Information technology organizations based in Europe
International law enforcement agencies
Cybercrime Centre
Organisations based in The Hague
Cybercrime Centre